Kai or KAI may refer to:

Arts and entertainment

Fictional entities
Kai (name), includes list of fictional characters called Kai
 The Kai, a fictional society in the Lone Wolf gamebooks
 Cobra Kai, a fictional Karate dojo in The Karate Kid movies and Cobra Kai streaming television series.

Music
 Kai, a kind of overtone singing in the Altai Republic and Khakassia
 Kai (band), an Asian-American R&B musical group
 Kai, a compilation album in the Dir En Grey discography (2001)
 "Kai", song by The Future Sound of London from their 1994 album ISDN
Kai (EP), the eponymous debut extended play by Korean singer Kai of EXO

Businesses and organizations
 Korea Aerospace Industries, a South Korean aerospace company
PT Kereta Api Indonesia, Indonesian railway operator
KAI Commuter, an Indonesian commuter rail operator
 Communist Workers' International, a council communist international
 Studio Kai, a Japanese animation studio

People
 Kai (name) includes lists of people with the given name and surname
 Kayı tribe or Kai tribe, an Oghuz Turkic people 
 Kai (Canadian singer) (Alessia De Gasperis-Brigante, born 1990), Canadian singer-songwriter
 Kai (wrestler) (Atsushi Sakai, born 1983), Japanese professional wrestler
 Kai (musician, born 1981), (Jung Ki-yeol), South Korean singer and actor
 Kai (entertainer, born 1994) (Kim Jong-in), member of the South Korean-Chinese boy group Exo
 Kai, drummer in the Japanese rock band The Gazette
 Kai the Hatchet-Wielding Hitchhiker, hitchhiker Caleb McGillvary, subject of a viral video and a Netflix documentary

Places
 Kai, Iran, a village in West Azerbaijan Province, Iran
 Kai Islands, Indonesia
 Kaï, Mali, a small town and commune
 Kai Province, an old Japanese province
 Kai, Yamanashi, a Japanese city
 Kaizhou District, formerly Kai County, Chongqing Municipality, China

Other uses 
 Kai (conjunction), in Greek, Coptic and Esperanto
 KaiOS, a mobile operating system for keypad feature phones
 Kai Restaurant, Arizona
 kai, ISO 639-3 language code for Karekare language
 Kanaanäische und Aramäische Inschriften, standard source for text of Canaanite and Aramaic inscriptions not contained in Tanakh or Old Testament
 Kai stingaree (Urolophus kaianus), a species of stingray in the family Urolophidae
 Kai, a cultivar of Karuka
 Kai, in Māori cuisine and New Zealand cooking, a term widely used to refer to food
 Kai, short for Kai Ken, a Japanese dog breed named after the Kai Province

See also
 
 Cai (disambiguation)
 Kay (disambiguation)
 Kei (disambiguation)
 Kye (disambiguation)